Cambarus reburrus, the French Broad crayfish, is a species of crayfish in the family Cambaridae. It is endemic to North Carolina.

The IUCN conservation status of Cambarus reburrus is "LC", least concern, with no immediate threat to the species' survival. The IUCN status was reviewed in 2010.

References

Further reading

 
 
 

Cambaridae
Articles created by Qbugbot
Crustaceans described in 1968
Freshwater crustaceans of North America
Endemic fauna of North Carolina